The Mahabharata is one of the epics of Sanskrit literature that is translated as well as literarily adapted into Meitei language (officially called Manipuri language), thereby creating a space for Hindu literature within the granary of Meitei literature (Manipuri literature). 

As Meitei language uses both Meitei script as well as Eastern Nagari script (Bengali script), the literary works are written in either of the two scripts.

History

Parikshit (Saka 1647) 
Meitei King Pamheiba, after being converted into Hinduism from Sanamahism (traditional Meitei religion) by Guru Gopaldas, composed the "Parikshit", an episode of the Mahabharata epic in Meitei language. Because this part of the story was the most appealing to him personally. In the introduction to the literary work, the text says that the story of Parikshit was rewritten by the Meitei king, "Sri Garib Niwaj", also known also as "Sri Sri Gopal Singh", in the Hindu year "Saka 1647". 
The work was actually a translation of a Bengali literary work by Gangadas Sen into Meitei language. Later, the Meitei version was retouched by Angom Gopi.

Virat Santhuplon (Saka 1702) 
The  is a Meitei translation of the Bengali work by Ramkrishna Das. The translation work was done by the Meitei prince Nabananda when the Meitei capital city was situated at Langthabal. 
The Cheitharol Kumbaba mentioned that the prince was formally made the heir apparent when his father Ching-Thang Khomba ascended the throne of Manipur Kingdom when Ching-Thang Khomba's elder brother Gourashyam died in "Saka 1685". Prince Nanananda spent around two months in the woods for carrying out a royal task of cutting down large trees for preparing race-boats. During those days of his stay in the forests, as a part of his leisure hours, he did the translation work on the part of the Mahabharata epic.
The introduction to the Meitei work says the following:

Unlike other Meitei literary works on Hinduism, this text is free from the usual mixing of the words of Indo Aryan languages.

List

Works of Kalachand Shastri 

Kalachand Singh Shastri translated 37 volumes of the Mahabharata into Meitei language, for which he was bestowed the prestigious Sahitya Akademi Award for translation.

Works of Manisana Sharma

Works of Ayekpam Syamsunder

Works of Ningthoujam Haridas Singh

Works of Aheibam Dhananjay

See also 

 Andhra Mahabharatam - the Telugu language version of the Mahabharata
 List of Tirukkural translations by language
 Mahabharata#Translations, versions and derivative works
 Versions of the Ramayana

Notes

References

External links 

 

Classical literature
Hindu literature
Mahabharata
Meitei literature
Translations into Meitei
Works based on the Mahabharata